Dismegistus costalis is a species of true bugs belonging to the family Parastrachiidae.

Distribution
This species is present in Ethiopia.

References

Shield bugs
Insects of Ethiopia